Brotherhood of the Cross and Star (BCS) is a religious organisation founded in 1956 by Olumba Olumba in Calabar, Cross River State, Nigeria. It differs from mainstream Christianity in that it maintains that BCS is not a church but the new Kingdom of God on Earth and that its founder, Olumba Olumba Obu, is the Holy Spirit personified, the God of all creation; while his eldest son, Olumba Olumba Jr., is the returned Jesus Christ. BCS incorporates into Christian teaching ideas of incarnation and reincarnation.

Beliefs
Central belief: Love towards other men.

God: God is biospiritually interconnected with all things in nature, is male and female, and good and evil.

Jesus: Jesus did not have time to fully communicate his beliefs before crucifixion, and Obu’s role has been to explain, expand upon and add to his teaching. This is why a part of Brotherhood teaching has no counterpart in either the Old or the New Testament. His son, Rowland, continues to add to the teachings. BCS followers suggest that Obu's achievements exceed those of Jesus.

Reincarnation: Because of a belief in the transmigration of souls between humans and animals, BCS members practice vegetarianism and veganism. (They are also teetotal.)

Medicine: The BCS website says that "BCS do not believe in medicine of any form".

Olumba Olumba Obu: In official BCS literature, it is suggested that Obu has the attributes of God, although Obu has gone on record as saying "I am not Jesus Christ or God.". BCS says that it believes that calamity will come if the world does not worship Obu as God.

National politics
BCS is not politically inclined, but her members are involved in Nigerian politics. Their spiritual leader Olumba Olumba Obu makes declarations and predictions about Nigerian politics.

International aspirations
BCS has bethels (churches) in several countries other than Nigeria, and  formed a "Government", sending ambassadors to several countries. The BCS has a cable TV station called "Starcross TV".

References

Further reading
 Reachout Trust
 Olumba Olumba Obu and African Traditional Culture

External links
 BCS website

Christian new religious movements
Religion in Nigeria